Axel John Doruelo is a Filipino former professional basketball player. He played college basketball for the SSC-Cavite Baycats and the UP Fighting Maroons. He last played for the San Miguel Beermen in the PBA.

College career 
Doruelo first played for the SSC-Cavite Baycats in the NCRAA. He scored 35 points in a win over Rizal Technological University.

For UAAP Season 68, Doruelo transferred to the UP Fighting Maroons. In a win against the NU Bulldogs, he had 20 points and 12 rebounds. UP head coach Lito Vergara called him a "blessing". He then had a career-high 26 points (with 16 of them in the second half) and 13 rebounds in a win against the Adamson Soaring Falcons. UP did not make it into the Final Four that season, finishing in fifth place.

Semi-professional career 
In 2006, Doruelo played in the Philippine Basketball League (PBL) for Hapee-PCU. He also played for the Rain or Shine Elastopainters, the Teletech Titans, and the Noosa Shoes Stars.

Doruelo also played in the regional league Liga Pilipinas. He scored 21 points in a win over the Cebu Niños.

Professional career 
Doruelo was among 33 undrafted players in the 2009 PBA Draft.

ABL career 
Doruelo then played for the Thai Tigers in the ASEAN Basketball League (ABL). 

He also played for the San Miguel Beermen for the 2013 ABL season.

PBA career 
In 2011, he then played for the Petron Blaze Boosters in the Philippine Basketball Association (PBA).

He then returned to the Beermen after his ABL stint. He was mostly on the reserves list.

Career stats

References

UP Fighting Maroons basketball players
Filipino men's basketball players
1982 births
Living people
Place of birth missing (living people)
Point guards
San Miguel Beermen players